Street Corner is a 1929 black-and-white short film directed by Russell Birdwell and starring Josef Swickard and Henry B. Walthall.

External links
Street Corner (1929) at IMDB

1929 films
American black-and-white films
1929 short films